SH2 may stand for:

 SH2 (classification), a Paralympic shooting classification
 SH2 domain (Src Homology 2), a protein domain within the Src oncoprotein
 SH-2 Seasprite, an American-built ship-based helicopter
 SH-2, an iteration of the SuperH CPU core developed by Hitachi
 Shadow Hearts: Covenant, also known as Shadow Hearts II
 Silent Hill 2, a 2001 survival horror video game
 State Highway 2, see List of highways numbered 2